The People's Mosquito is a Limited Company Registered in England and Wales (No 8145785) and a UK Registered Charity (No.1165903) and of de Havilland Mosquito RL249, which it intends to restore.

In August 2017 the project was given a boost when an archive of 22,000 technical drawings, on aperture cards, discovered in a soon to-be-demolished building, near Chester, belonging to Airbus were acquired by the charity, and digitised for £4,000.

In 2018, The People's Mosquito announced that Retrotec Ltd, a firm of aircraft restoration specialists, had been appointed to undertake the work of restoring RL249 to flight status. A newly-manufactured Mosquito assembly building is being prepared and work has started on constructing the first mould for a Mosquito fuselage to be seen in the UK for more than 70 years.

In March, 2019, the container ship 'Al Dahna' arrived in Southampton Water with a container from Napier, New Zealand. This container was transported to the workshops of Retrotec Ltd, where over six tonnes of jigs and fixtures were unpacked. The fixtures had been acquired by The People's Mosquito from Aerowood, the New Zealand woodworking concern, and had been previously used to produce the wings, tail fin, rudder, horizontal tailplanes, elevators, flaps, tank bay doors and bomb bay doors for the last FB.VI to be flown, PZ474. TPM also acquired CAD drawings of the Mosquito from Aerowood, NZ, as well as a set of completed wing ribs.

References

External links

 http://www.peoplesmosquito.org.uk/2019/04/27/a-giant-leap-forward-for-rl249s-return-to-flight/
 https://www.peoplesmosquitoclub.org.uk/

Aircraft preservation
Charities based in the United Kingdom